Biharwe Division is one of the six administrative divisions that make up Mbarara Municipality of Western Uganda.
The six divisions that make Mbarara Municipality include, Kamukuzi Division, Nyamitanga Division, Kakoba Division, Biharwe Division, Kakiika Division and Nyakayojo Division.

Location

Biharwe Division borders with Kiruhura District in the east, Kakiika Division in the West and south, and Rubaya Subcounty of Mbarara District in the North.

Overview

Biharwe Division was added to Mbarara Municipality on 1 July 2014 together with Nyakayojo Division and Kakiika Division.
The Division contains mainly farmers with its headquarters at Biharwe.
The area is also a home to the football club Biharwe F.C.

The neighborhoods with in the division include: Biharwe town Kamatarasi, Kishasha, Katojo, Nyabuhama, Nyaruhanga, Nyakinengo, Rwemikunyu, Rwenjeru, Kibwera and Migamba.

Population
The 2014 National Population and housing census found the population of Biharwe Division at 21,941

Points of interest
 Igongo cultural centre a 3 star hotel.
 The 1520 AD Eclipse monument.

See also
 Biharwe
 Biharwe F.C.
 Mbarara

References

Mbarara